Juan Mónaco was the defending champion but lost to Nicolás Almagro in the quarterfinals.
Fabio Fognini defeated qualifier Federico Delbonis 4–6, 7–6(10–8), 6–2 to win his first ATP World Tour 500 event and second career title in as many weeks.

Seeds
All seeds receive a bye into the second round.

Draw

Finals

Top half

Section 1

Section 2

Bottom half

Section 3

Section 4

Qualifying

Seeds

Qualifiers

Qualifying draw

First qualifier

Second qualifier

Third qualifier

Fourth qualifier

Fifth qualifier

Sixth qualifier

References
Main Draw
Qualifying Draw

2013 ATP World Tour
Singles